Stipendiary magistrates were magistrates that were paid for their work (they received a stipend). They existed in the judiciaries of the United Kingdom and those of several former British territories, where they sat in the lowest-level criminal courts.

United Kingdom

England and Wales 
Stipendiary magistrates sat in the magistrates' courts of England and Wales, alongside unpaid 'lay' magistrates, generally hearing the more serious cases. In London, stipendiary magistrates were known as metropolitan stipendiary magistrates. Until 1949, they were known as metropolitan police magistrates. There was also a Chief Metropolitan Stipendiary Magistrate for London, with additional administrative duties.

In August 2000, stipendiary magistrates, including metropolitan stipendiary magistrates, were replaced by the new role of district judge (magistrates' courts). There is also now a Senior District Judge (Chief Magistrate).

Scotland 

Stipendiary magistrates were the most junior judges in the Scottish judiciary. The Courts Reform (Scotland) Act 2014, passed by the  Scottish Parliament, abolished the post with the creation of the new post of summary sheriff.

In 2014 there were only 4.9 full-time equivalent posts and the only court they sat in was the Justice of the Peace Court in Glasgow. The intention is that there will be a larger number of summary sheriffs, with around 60 of them sitting in more justice of the peace courts and sheriff courts, throughout the country. Under the Act any stipendiary magistrates in post on implementation of the legislation became summary sheriffs and transferred unless they declined appointment.

Summary sheriffs are able to sit in justice of the peace courts and sheriff courts. In justice of the peace courts they can exercise the same summary criminal powers as a justice of the peace. However, when they sit in a sheriff court they will exercise the same powers as a sheriff in relation to summary criminal business.

Duties
All six sheriffs principal had the power to appoint stipendiary magistrates but the power had only been used in the Sheriffdom of Glasgow and Strathkelvin.

Stipendiary magistrates exercised the same powers as a sheriff (judge) when dealing with summary criminal cases. Like sheriffs, stipendiary magistrates wore wig and gown in court.

Stipendiary magistrates were approved solicitors or advocates, and they handled similar summary cases as sheriffs, for example drink driving, dangerous driving and assault cases. They could impose sentences of up to one year's imprisonment and fines of up to £10,000.

Other jurisdictions

Stipendiary magistrates have also existed in the judiciary of Australia, the judiciary of Canada and the judiciary of New Zealand.

The post was abolished in New Zealand in 1980 when it was renamed to district court judge.

References

Judiciary of Scotland
Scottish criminal law
Judiciary of England and Wales
English criminal law
Judges
Legal professions